Gold is the fourth compilation album by Marika Gombitová, released on OPUS in 2005.

Track listing

Official releases
 2005: Gold, CD, OPUS #91 2701
 2008: Gold: Komplet 1, 8CD (box set + 3 bonus tracks), OPUS #91 2724

Personnel

 Marika Gombitová – lead vocal, writer
 Ján Lehotský – music
 Andrej Šeban – music
 Václav Patejdl – music
 Kamil Peteraj – lyrics
 Ján Lauko – producer

 Milan Vašica – producer
 Peter Breiner – producer
 Peter Smolinský – producer
 Ján Červenka – remastering
 Tibor Borský – photography
 Master Vision – design

Charts

Certifications

ČNS IFPI
In Slovakia, the International Federation of the Phonographic Industry for the Czech Republic (ČNS IFPI) awards artists since the cancellation of the Slovak national section (SNS IFPI). Currently, there are awarded Gold (for 3,000 units), and/or Platinum certifications (for 6,000 units), exclusively for album releases. Gombitová demonstrably won at least seven platinum, and three golden awards in total.

References

General

Specific

External links 
 

2005 compilation albums
Marika Gombitová compilation albums